The International Journal of Wavelets, Multiresolution and Information Processing has been published since 2003 by World Scientific. It covers both theory and application of wavelet analysis, multiresolution, and information processing in a variety of disciplines in science and engineering.

Abstracting and indexing 

The journal is abstracted and indexed in:

 Mathematical Reviews
 Zentralblatt MATH
 Science Citation Index Expanded
 CompuMath Citation Index
 Current Contents/Engineering, Computing, and Technology
 Compendex
 INSPEC
 ISI

Editor-in-Chief:
Yuan Yan Tang

Managing Editor:
Luoqing Li

Computer science journals
Publications established in 2003
World Scientific academic journals
English-language journals